The 2010 Florida Commissioner of Agriculture election took place on November 2, 2010, to elect the Florida Commissioner of Agriculture. The election was won by Adam Putnam who took office on January 4, 2011.

Republican primary

Democratic primary

General election

References

https://web.archive.org/web/20110727130144/http://enight.dos.state.fl.us/Index.asp?ElectionDate=11%2F2%2F2010&DATAMODE=

Florida Commissioner of Agriculture elections
Commissioner of Agriculture
Florida Commissioner of Agriculture